Don "The Nuge" Nguyen is an American professional skateboarder from Oklahoma City, Oklahoma, currently residing in California. He rides for Baker Skateboards and played Shogo Kubo in the 2005  biographical drama film Lords of Dogtown. He also played bass for American Ruse and can be seen playing bass as part of the LSDemons (along with Justin (Figgy) Figueroa and Thomas Bonilla).

Filmography

References

External links
Don's official blog
Baker official site
Foundation Skateboards official

American skateboarders
Sportspeople from Oklahoma City
Living people
Year of birth missing (living people)